Natalie Ross (born 14 September 1989) is a Scottish football midfielder who plays for Celtic and has represented Scotland at youth and senior level.

Club career
Ross began her career with Hibernian Ladies before leaving to join Arsenal Ladies in July 2008. After an ankle injury disrupted Ross' progress during two seasons at Arsenal, she returned to Hibernian on loan in January 2011, before signing for Celtic for the start of the 2012 season.

After a short spell back in England with Lewes, Ross signed for Rangers in January 2013. She returned to Celtic in January 2016.

International career
Ross made her debut for the senior Scotland team at the Cyprus Women's Cup in March 2008, against the Netherlands as a second-half substitute for Julie Fleeting.

Personal life
Natalie Ross’s brother Frank Ross is also a footballer, with former club  Aberdeen. Currently playing in Holland with Go Ahead Eagles. Her father Frank Ross has won the Scottish Cup as head coach of Aberdeen Girls u15’s in 2002 & 2004.

Honours

Club

Arsenal
London County Cup: 2009
Celtic
SWPL Cup: 2017

Individual
MNE Premier Division Player of the Year: 2012
SWPL Player of the Month: March 2015

References

External links

 Scotland FA Profile

1989 births
Living people
Scottish women's footballers
Scotland women's international footballers
Arsenal W.F.C. players
Hibernian W.F.C. players
FA Women's National League players
Footballers from Aberdeen
Celtic F.C. Women players
Lewes F.C. Women players
Rangers W.F.C. players
Women's association football midfielders
Scottish Women's Premier League players